The Ilt'an Line is an electrified  long railway line of the Korean State Railway in North Hamgyŏng Province, North Korea from Rodong on the P'yŏngra Line to Hwadae. The first  section, from Rodong to Ilt'an, was opened before 2003, and a  extension from Ilt'an to Hwadae was opened some time between 2010 and 2013.

Route 

A yellow background in the "Distance" box indicates that section of the line is not electrified.

References

Railway lines in North Korea
Standard gauge railways in North Korea